Henry Nisbet of Dean (floruit 1570–1608) was a Scottish merchant and Provost of Edinburgh.

Life

Nisbet was a textile merchant and clothier. In 1587 he supplied the French ambassador Monsieur de Courcelles with violet crimson cloth for his attendant's clothes, mourning cloth at death of Mary, Queen of Scots, a  beaver hat, silk points, and ribbon for the ambassador's shoes, and other items. He also advanced the ambassador large sums of money.

He took royal letters to Charles IX of France in April 1583 asking for tax relief for Scottish merchants. He also brought a letter to Esmé Stewart, 1st Duke of Lennox.

He was Provost of Edinburgh in 1597. In July 1598 Nisbet was a member of a committee of lawyers and ministers including John Preston of Fentonbarns, Robert Rollock and John Russell who drew up a syllabus for the University of Edinburgh in July 1598 including readings from Latin authors. He owned Dean House just west of Edinburgh, and a house on the High Street. Dean House was demolished to create Dean Cemetery.

The National Museum of Scotland has painted ceiling fragments from ceiling of the gallery in Dean House showing the Sacrifice of Isaac, Judith, and other subjects. The paintings may date from the time of his son, William Nisbet. A carved pediment for a window was inscribed; "H. N." for Henry Nisbet with the Nisbet heraldry, and a stone panel with "I. B." and the Bellenden heraldry for his wife, Jonet Bellenden.

Henry Nisbet died in 1608 and his sons James and William obtained permission from the town council to build a monument.

Family
He married Jonet Bannatyne or Bellenden (d. 1621). Their children included:
 William Nisbet of Dean, who married (1) Jonet Williamson, and (2) Katherine Dick (d. 1630).
 Patrick Nisbet, Lord Eastbank
 James Nisbet (1557-1621), was a Bailie of Edinburgh, and on 5 February 1613 was sent with the town's gift to the wedding of Princess Elizabeth and Frederick V of the Palatinate. He married Marion Arnot, daughter of Sir John Arnot of Birswick (a former Provost of Edinburgh) and through this marriage inherited Lochend House near Restalrig, and was known as James Nisbet of Restalrig.

External links
 Painted panel from Dean House showing St Luke painting, National Museum of Scotland

References

16th-century Scottish people
Businesspeople from Edinburgh
Scottish merchants
16th-century births
1608 deaths
Year of birth unknown